The Cambridge by-election of 21 September 1967 was held after the premature death of Cambridge's Labour MP (MP) Robert Davies in June 1967.

The seat was highly marginal, having only been won by Labour during the previous year's Labour landslide by 439 votes, and it had only been the second time Labour had ever taken the constituency. In the ensuing by-election, a swing of more than eight percent to the Conservatives saw their candidate David Lane win by 5,978 votes.

Candidates
David Lane was an Eton, Cambridge and Yale-educated former barrister who had been working for Shell Oil since 1959. He was the only candidate to have previously contested the seat, having done so in 1966.
George Bazeley Scurfield (1920-1991) was educated at St. John's College, Cambridge, and was a writer and second-hand bookseller. He had been a member of Cambridge City Council representing Petersfield ward from 1963 to 1966, and he would go on to contest the seat again in 1970.
David Spreckley (1915-13), a caravan builder, was a former Labour member of Huntingdonshire County Council. He had been the Liberal candidate for Great Yarmouth in the 1964 general election and Huntingdon in 1966. He would go on to contest the 1969 Newcastle-under-Lyme by-election for the Liberals.

Result of the previous general election

Result of the by-election on 21 September 1967

The Conservative victory was described as "always expected"  in an editorial in the next day's The Glasgow Herald. The result was overshadowed by the shock outcome of the same day's Walthamstow West by-election, where and 18.4% Labour to Conservative swing saw the Conservatives narrowly gain a seat Labour had held since 1929.

References

1967 in England
1967 elections in the United Kingdom
By-election, 1967
By-election, 1967
By-elections to the Parliament of the United Kingdom in Cambridgeshire constituencies
20th century in Cambridge